Harness is an extinct town in Stone County, Arkansas, United States. The GNIS classifies it as a populated place.

A post office called Harness was established in 1922, and remained in operation until 1957. The origin of the name "Harness" is obscure.

References

Ghost towns in Arkansas
Geography of Stone County, Arkansas